Kerala Samajam Model School (KSMS) is one of the best private English-medium co-educational school in Jamshedpur, Jharkhand, India that was established in 1981. It is managed by a Board of Trustees and affiliated to the Council for the Indian School Certificate Examinations.

House System
The students are divided into four houses, namely Charity, Hope, Joy, and Peace. The students from these houses compete throughout the year. The House Championship is given to the house with maximum points after the Annual Sports Day, which is generally held in early December.

Main Events
 Annual academic prize night in June/July.
 Annual Youth Festival in December.
 Annual Sports Meet in November/December.
 Safety week and Ethics Day.
 Graduation Night and picnic for Std.12 in January.
 May Day, Republic Day, Independence Day, Teacher's Day & Children's Day celebrations.
 Primary/Middle School Function.

Kerala Samajam Hindi School(KSHS)
Back in 1991, some stray incidents of stone-pelting and hurling abuse by some slum kids in the vicinity upset the serenity of Kerala Samajam Model School (KSMS), one of the premier English-medium schools in Jamshedpur. These children hailed from the lowest rung of society and their parents neither had the means nor the awareness to send their children to school. A Total Literacy Mission survey by KSMS revealed that the dimension of such underprivileged and Out-of-School Children is much wider and urgency was felt to bring them within the ambit of School Education. But the question was how do we do it? We decided to experiment with the idea of using the “idle hours” of the school to bring these kids into the mainstream.

KSMS Project School has been running uninterruptedly since, and its student strength has gone up from 50 to 1472. After experimenting with this concept for six years and inspired by this success story, four more such Afternoon Schools were started in the campus of the English-Medium Schools run under the banner of Kerala Public School Trust.

Thus, today, five Afternoon Schools are run in the premises of Kerala Samajam Model School and Kerala Public Schools in Jamshedpur catering to around 4,100 students.

Following our success, four additional local English-medium schools have started this program, taking the number of schools promoting this program today to nine and the total number of students to 7560. Additionally, we have been able to garner the support of local merchants, the parents of our students, and local authorities and industries in this program.

See also
Education in India
Literacy in India
List of schools in India

References

External links
 Kerala Samajam Model School – An ISO 9001-2015 Certified Institution (ksms.ac.in)
 Kerala Samajam Model School news
 

Schools in Jharkhand
Education in Jamshedpur
Educational institutions established in 1981
1981 establishments in Bihar